Einara is a small genus of slickheads found in the deep waters of the oceans. They can grow to  standard length

The etymology of the genus name is uncertain but could refer Norwegian marine biologist Einar Koefoed.

Species
There are currently two recognized species in this genus:
 Einara edentula (Alcock, 1892) (toothless smooth-head)
 Einara macrolepis (Koefoed, 1927) (loosescale smooth-head)

References

Alepocephalidae
Ray-finned fish genera
Marine fish genera
Taxa named by Albert Eide Parr